Polflucht (from German, flight from the poles) is a geophysical concept invoked in 1922 by Alfred Wegener to explain his ideas of continental drift. He suggested that a differential gravitational force (horizontal component of centrifugal or Eötvös force) and the Earth's flattening would cause continental masses to drift slowly towards the equator.

The hypothesis was expanded by Paul Sophus Epstein in 1920 but the force is now known to be far too weak to cause plate tectonics. The strength of the layers of the Earth's crust is much stronger than assumed by Wegener and Epstein.

Literature
 The concise Oxford dictionary of Earth Sciences (topic 'Polflucht'), Oxford 1990 
 Laszlo Egyed: Physik der festen Erde (Physics of solid Earth), 368p. Akadémiai Kiadó, Budapest 1969
 Über die Polflucht der Kontinente, F.Nölke 1921

Geophysics
Plate tectonics
Obsolete scientific theories